Naduvattom  is a census town in Malappuram district in the state of Kerala, India. 
CAVENDERS Arts & Sports Club is a famous club in Naduvattom.

Demographics
 India census, Naduvattom had a population of 18891 with 9049 males and 9842 females.

Transportation
Naduvattam village connects to other parts of India through Kuttippuram town.  National highway No.66 passes through Edappal and the northern stretch connects to Goa and Mumbai.  The southern stretch connects to Cochin and Trivandrum.   National Highway No.966 connects to Palakkad and Coimbatore.  The nearest airport is at Kozhikode.  The nearest major railway station is at Kuttippuram.

References

Cities and towns in Malappuram district
Kuttippuram area